Dominic "Nick" Sharkey (4 May 1943 – 8 February 2015) was a Scottish footballer who played for Sunderland as a forward.

Club career
Sharkey began his career with Sunderland where he made his debut on 9 April 1960 against Scunthorpe United in a 1–0 win at Roker Park. In total, he made 99 league appearances, scoring 51 goals for the club from 1960 to 1966. He then joined Leicester City in 1966, but made just six appearances, scoring five goals. His next club was Mansfield Town where he signed for in 1968. He scored 17 goals in 69 games for the club. He finished his League career with North East team Hartlepool United in 1970, where he made a total of 60 appearances with 12 goals to his name, and then moved into non-League football with South Shields.

References

1943 births
2015 deaths
Scottish footballers
Sunderland A.F.C. players
Leicester City F.C. players
Mansfield Town F.C. players
Hartlepool United F.C. players
South Shields F.C. (1936) players
People from Helensburgh
Association football forwards
Scotland under-23 international footballers
English Football League players
Sportspeople from Argyll and Bute